KRDA (92.1 FM) is licensed to Clovis, California. It serves the Fresno, California, area.  It is owned by Latino Media Network; under a local marketing agreement, it is programmed by former owner TelevisaUnivision's Uforia Audio Network. KRDA broadcasts a Spanish adult contemporary format.

History
On August 2, 2016, 92.1 swapped call letters and formats with KRDA 107.5, Spanish Adult Hits.

KRDA was one of eighteen radio stations that TelevisaUnivision sold to Latino Media Network in a $60 million deal announced in June 2022, approved by the Federal Communications Commission (FCC) that November, and completed in January 2023. Under the terms of the deal, Univision agreed to continue programming the station for up to one year under a local marketing agreement.

References

External links
KRDA website

RDA
Clovis, California
Univision Radio Network stations
RDA